Iris Smith is an American freestyle wrestler.

Iris Smith may also refer to:

Iris Smith, Hunter character played by Cec Verrell
Iris Smith, candidate in Chorley Council election, 2002